Johnson City is a city in Washington, Carter, and Sullivan counties in the U.S. state of Tennessee, mostly in Washington County. As of the 2020 United States census, the population was 71,046, making it the eighth largest city in Tennessee. Johnson City is the principal city of the Johnson City Metropolitan Statistical Area, which consists of Carter, Unicoi, and Washington counties and had a population of 207,285 as of 2020. The MSA is also a component of the Johnson City–Kingsport–Bristol, Tennessee–Virginia Combined Statistical Area – commonly known as the "Tri-Cities" region. This CSA is the fifth-largest in Tennessee with a population of 514,899 as of 2020.

History
William Bean, traditionally recognized as Tennessee's first white settler, built his cabin along Boone's Creek near Johnson City in 1769. In the 1780s, Colonel John Tipton (1730–1813) established a farm (now the Tipton-Haynes State Historic Site) just outside what is now Johnson City. During the State of Franklin movement, Tipton was a leader of the loyalist faction, residents of the region who wanted to remain part of North Carolina rather than form a separate state. In February 1788, an armed engagement took place at Tipton's farm between Tipton and his men and the forces led by John Sevier, the leader of the Franklin faction.

Founded in 1856 by Henry Johnson as a railroad station called "Johnson's Depot", Johnson City became a major rail hub for the Southeast, as three railway lines crossed in the downtown area.

In the late 19th and early 20th centuries, Johnson City served as headquarters for the narrow gauge East Tennessee and Western North Carolina Railroad (the ET&WNC, nicknamed "Tweetsie") and the standard gauge Clinchfield Railroad. Both rail systems featured excursion trips through scenic portions of the Blue Ridge Mountains and were engineering marvels of railway construction. The Southern Railway (now Norfolk Southern) also passes through the city.

During the American Civil War, before it was formally incorporated in 1869, the name of the town was briefly changed to "Haynesville" in honor of Confederate Senator Landon Carter Haynes.

Henry Johnson's name was quickly restored following the war, with Johnson elected as the city's first mayor on January 3, 1870. The town grew rapidly from 1870 until 1890 as railroad and mining interests flourished. However, the national depression of 1893, which caused many railway failures (including the Charleston, Cincinnati and Chicago Railroad or "3-Cs", a predecessor of the Clinchfield) and resulting financial panic, halted Johnson City's boom town momentum.

In 1901, the Mountain Branch of the National Home for Disabled Volunteer Soldiers (now the U.S. Veterans Affairs Medical Center and National Cemetery), Mountain Home, Tennessee was created by an act of Congress introduced by Walter P. Brownlow.  Johnson City began growing rapidly and became the fifth-largest city in Tennessee by 1930.

Together with neighboring Bristol, Johnson City was a hotbed for old-time music. It hosted noteworthy Columbia Records recording sessions in 1928 known as the Johnson City Sessions. Native son "Fiddlin' Charlie" Bowman became a national recording star via these sessions. The Fountain Square area in downtown featured a host of local and traveling street entertainers including Blind Lemon Jefferson.

During the 1920s and the Prohibition era, Johnson City's ties to the bootlegging activity of the Appalachian Mountains earned the city the nickname of "Little Chicago". 

For many years, the city had a municipal "privilege tax" on carnival shows, in an attempt to dissuade traveling circuses and other transient entertainment businesses from doing business in town. The use of drums by merchants to draw attention to their goods is prohibited. Title Six, Section 106 of the city's municipal code, the so-called "Barney Fife" ordinance, empowers the city's police force to draft into involuntary service as many of the town's citizens as necessary to aid police in making arrests and in preventing or quelling any riot, unlawful assembly or breach of peace.

Geography

Johnson City is in northeastern Washington County at  (36.3354, -82.3728), 

Climate
Johnson City has a humid subtropical climate (Köppen Cfa), with warm summers and cool winters. Temperatures in Johnson City are moderated somewhat by its elevation and proximity to the Appalachian Mountains. Summer is typically the wettest part of the year, while early autumn is considerably drier.

Demographics

2020 census

As of the 2020 United States census, there were 71,046 people, 30,724 households, and 15,904 families residing in the city.

2000 census
As of the census of 2000, there were 55,469 people, 23,720 households, and 14,018 families residing in the city. The population density was 1,412.4 per square mile. There were 25,730 housing units at an average density of 655.1 per square mile (253.0/km2). The racial makeup of the city was 90.09 percent white, 6.40 percent African American, 0.26% Native American, 1.22 percent Asian, 0.02 percent Pacific Islander, 0.69 percent from other races, and 1.32 percent from two or more races. Hispanic or Latino of any race were 1.89 percent of the population.

There were 23,720 households, out of which 25.0 percent had children under the age of 18 living with them, 44.1 percent were married couples living together, 11.6 percent had a female householder with no husband present, and 40.9 percent were non-families. 33.9 percent of all households were made up of individuals, and 11.5 percent had someone living alone who was 65 years of age or older. The average household size was 2.20, and the average family size was 2.82.

In the city, the population was spread out, with 19.8 percent under the age of 18, 13.7 percent from 18 to 24, 28.1 percent from 25 to 44, 22.5 percent from 45 to 64, and 15.9 percent who were 65 years of age or older. The median age was 37 years. For every 100 females, there were 91.1 males. For every 100 females age 18 and over, there were 88.0 males.

The median income for a household in the city was $30,835, and the median income for a family was $40,977. Males had a median income of $31,326 versus $22,150 for females. The per capita income for the city was $20,364. About 11.4 percent of families and 15.9 percent of the population were below the poverty line, including 18.9 percent of those under age 18 and 12.7 percent of those age 65 or over.

Economy

Johnson City is an economic hub largely fueled by East Tennessee State University and the medical "Med-Tech" corridor, anchored by the Johnson City Medical Center  and Niswonger Children's Hospital (of Ballad Health), Franklin Woods Community Hospital (also of Ballad Health), ETSU's Gatton College of Pharmacy and ETSU's Quillen College of Medicine.

The popular citrus soda Mountain Dew traces its origins to Johnson City. In July 2012, PepsiCo announced a new malt-flavored version of the drink named Mountain Dew Johnson City Gold in honor of the city. The drink was test marketed in the Chicago metropolitan area, Denver, and Charlotte, beginning in late August.

Major companies headquartered in Johnson City 
 American Water Heater Company (owned by A.O. Smith Corp.)
 Advanced Call Center Technologies
 Cantech Industries
 General Shale Brick LLC
 LPI, Inc.
 Mayes Brothers Tool Mfg
 Moody Dunbar, Inc.
 Mullican Flooring
 R.A. Colby,  Inc.
 TPI Corporation

Other companies
 JD Squared, manufacturer of tube and pipe benders and other fabrication tools

Arts and culture

Shopping

As a regional hub for a four-state area, Johnson City is home to a large variety of retail businesses, from well-known national chains to local boutiques and galleries.

The Mall at Johnson City is the city's only enclosed shopping mall. California-based Forever 21 opened an XXI Forever flagship store on the mall's upper level, and Express opened in late 2010. The nearby Target Center houses Target, T.J.Maxx, and Books-A-Million.

Much of the new retail development is in North Johnson City, along State of Franklin Road. Johnson City Crossings is the largest of these developments and houses Michael's, Ross, Old Navy, Bed Bath and Beyond, Shoe Carnival, and more. On the other side of the highway are retailers Kohl's, Lowe's, Sam's Club and Barnes & Noble.

Points of interest 
Boone Lake
Buffalo Mountain Park
East Tennessee State University Arboretum
ETSU/Mountain States Health Alliance Athletic Center
Founders Park
Freedom Hall Civic Center
Gray Fossil Site
Johnson City STOLport
Rocky Mount State Historic Site
Tennessee Hills Brewstillery, brewery and tasting room
Thomas Stadium, baseball venue
Tipton-Haynes State Historic Site
Tweetsie Trail
Watauga River
Wheatland (Knob Creek, Washington County, Tennessee)
William B. Greene Jr. Stadium
Yee Haw Brewing Co.

Sports
Several Minor League Baseball teams have been based in Johnson City. Professional baseball was first played in the city by the Johnson City Soldiers in the Southeastern League in 1910. The city's longest-running team was the Johnson City Cardinals, who played in the Appalachian League as the Rookie affiliate of the St. Louis Cardinals from 1975 to 2020. In conjunction with a contraction of Minor League Baseball beginning with the 2021 season, the Appalachian League was reorganized as a collegiate summer baseball league, and the Cardinals were replaced by the Johnson City Doughboys, a new franchise in the revamped league designed for rising college freshman and sophomores.

Government
In the United States House of Representatives, Johnson City is represented by Republican Diana Harshbarger of the 1st district.

Johnson City is run by a five-person board of commissioners:

Mayor: Joe Wise
Vice Mayor: Todd Fowler
Commissioner: Jenny Brock
Commissioner: Aaron T. Murphy
Commissioner: John Hunter

The city manager is Cathy Ball.

Education

Colleges and universities
East Tennessee State University has around 16,000 students in addition to a K-12 University School, a laboratory school of about 540 students. University School was the first laboratory school in the nation to adopt a year-round academic schedule.

Milligan University is just outside the city limits in Carter County, and has about 1,200 students in undergraduate and graduate programs.

Northeast State Community College has renovated a building in downtown Johnson City for use as a new satellite teaching site.

Tusculum College has a center on the north side of Johnson City in the Boones Creek area.

Johnson City School System
Elementary schools

Middle schools
Indian Trail Middle School
Liberty Bell Middle School

High schools
Science Hill High School

Private schools
Ashley Academy (PreK-8)
St. Mary's (K-8)
Providence Academy (K-12)
Tri-Cities Christian Schools (PreK-12)
University School (K-12)

Infrastructure

Transportation

Johnson City is served by Tri-Cities Regional Airport (IATA Code TRI) and Johnson City Airport (0A4) in Watauga.

Interstate highways
 Interstate 26

Johnson City is bisected by Interstate 26, which connects the city to Kingsport to the north and Asheville, North Carolina, and Spartanburg, South Carolina, to the south.

Major federal and state routes
U.S. Route 19W runs through the city, signed partially on I-26, before joining 19E near Bluff City en route to Bristol.
U.S. Route 11E connects Johnson City to Jonesborough and Greeneville to the southwest, and reunites with 11W to the northeast in Bristol before continuing on to Roanoke, Virginia. In Johnson City, route 11E forms a concurrency with North Roan Street, a major artery in the city.
U.S. Route 321, also partially on the 11E route, connects Johnson City to Elizabethton (forming a high-speed, limited-access freeway) before continuing on to Hickory and Gastonia, North Carolina.
U.S. Route 23 is concurrent with I-26 from North Carolina, through Johnson City, and north to the I-26 terminus in Kingsport.

Public transport
Johnson City Transit (JCT) operates a system of buses inside the city limits, including a route every fifteen minutes along Roan Street. Main transit routes operate 6:15 a.m. to 6:15 p.m. Monday through Friday, and 8:15 a.m. to 5:15 p.m. on Saturdays. JCT also has an evening route that operates weeknights between 6:15 p.m. and 11:00 p.m. The Johnson City Transit Center is located downtown on West Market Street. JCT operates the BucShot, a system serving the greater ETSU campus.

The Southern Railway used to serve Johnson City with several trains: the Birmingham Special (ended, 1970), the Pelican (ended, 1970) and the Tennessean (ended, 1968).

Hospitals
Johnson City serves as a regional medical center for northeast Tennessee and southwest Virginia, along with parts of western North Carolina and southeastern Kentucky.

The Johnson City Medical Center, designated a Level 1 Trauma Center by the State of Tennessee, is one of Ballad Health's three tertiary hospitals.  Also affiliated with the center are the Niswonger Children's Hospital, a domestic affiliate of St. Jude Children's Research Hospital, and Woodridge Hospital, a mental health and chemical dependency facility.

Franklin Woods Community Hospital is a LEED-certified facility in North Johnson City. The hospital has 80 licensed beds and a 22-room Emergency Department. Of the licensed beds, 20 are dedicated to Women's and Children's Services.

The James H. & Cecile C. Quillen Rehabilitation Hospital, also in North Johnson City, serves patients who have suffered debilitating trauma, including stroke and brain-spine injuries.

Additionally, the James H. Quillen Veterans Affairs Medical Center, in the Mountain Home community in Johnson City's southside, serves veterans in the four-state region.  The center is closely involved with the East Tennessee State University James H. Quillen College of Medicine.

Notable people 

Bill Bain, management consultant, one of the founders of the management consultancy Bain & Company
Sam Bettens, lead singer of rock band K's Choice; Johnson City firefighter for a year
Jerry Blevins, Major League Baseball pitcher (New York Mets)
Ernie Bowman, Major League Baseball (San Francisco Giants, 1961–63)
Joe Bowman, bootmaker and marksman; guardian of western culture
Mike Brown, American Motorcyclist Association rider
Jo Carson, playwright and author 
George Lafayette Carter, entrepreneur
David Cash, professional wrestler
David Cole, founding member of C+C Music Factory
Patrick J. Cronin, television and film actor, a professor in English and Theater at ETSU
Matt Czuchry, actor (Gilmore Girls), attended Science Hill High School
David Davis, Tennessee state senator; U.S. congressman 2007-2009
Lindsay Ellis, American film critic, YouTuber, cinematographer, and author
Ray Flynn, miler with 89 sub-four-minute miles; graduated ETSU, president/CEO of Flynn Sports Management
Aubrayo Franklin, defensive tackle, San Francisco 49ers
Wyck Godfrey, film producer and studio executive
Jake Grove, born in Johnson City; played center for Virginia Tech, won the Rimington Trophy, played for the Miami Dolphins
Del Harris, NBA coach, attended Milligan College
Holly Herndon, electronic musician
Mark Herring, Attorney General of Virginia
Herman Hickman, College Football Hall of Fame player for the Tennessee Vols and NFL player.
Jim Hickman (1910s outfielder), was a former professional baseball player who played outfield for Brooklyn Dodgers.
Steven James, novelist, attended ETSU
Drew Johnson, political commentator and columnist, and founder of the Beacon Center of Tennessee
Amythyst Kiah, Americana singer/songwriter
Catherine Marshall, author, born in Johnson City, later worked on her novel Christy while staying with relatives in town
John Alan Maxwell, artist and illustrator, raised in Johnson City, illustrated for Pearl S. Buck, John Steinbeck, and Sir Arthur Conan Doyle, spent his last 18 years in Johnson City; permanent collection housed at Carroll Reece Museum at ETSU
Johnny Miller, NASCAR driver
Daniel Norris, Major League Baseball, debuted with the Toronto Blue Jays in 2014
Eureka O'Hara, drag queen and television personality
Mike Potter, NASCAR driver
David Phil Roe, mayor of Johnson City, and representative for Tennessee's 1st congressional district in from 2009 to 2021
Bryan Lewis Saunders, artist and writer, ETSU alumnus
Connie Saylor, NASCAR driver and Johnson City business owner
Constance Shulman, actress, singer, producer
Steve Spurrier, Heisman Trophy-winning quarterback and College Football Hall of Fame coach, spent most of his childhood in Johnson City and attended Science Hill High School. The school's football field is named Steve Spurrier Field.
Robert Love Taylor and Alfred A. Taylor, brothers who were both governor of Tennessee; each owned and resided in Robins' Roost, historic house on South Roan Street
Brad Teague, NASCAR driver
Phyllis Tickle, prominent author on religion and spirituality
Ed Whitson, MLB pitcher known for a brief but colorful stint with the Yankees in the 1980s
Samuel Cole Williams, historian, jurist, first dean of the Emory University School of Law
Van Williams, NFL running back and kick returner for Buffalo Bills, All-American at Carson-Newman, attended Science Hill High School

Sister cities
Johnson City's sister cities are:
 Guaranda, Ecuador
 Ronneby, Sweden
 Rybinsk, Russia
 Teterow, Germany

See also 

Music of East Tennessee

References
General

Specific
 Greater Johnson City, by Ray Stahl, 1986.
 A History of Johnson City, Tennessee and its Environs, by Samuel Cole Williams, 1940.
 History of Washington County, Tennessee, by Joyce and Gene Cox, Editors, 2001.
 Fiddlin' Charlie Bowman, by Bob L. Cox, University of Tennessee Press, 2007.
 The Railroads of Johnson City, by Johnny Graybeal, Tar Heel Press, 2007.

External links

Official website

Washington County, TN Economic Development Council
Johnson City Development Authority

 
Cities in Tennessee
Cities in Carter County, Tennessee
Cities in Sullivan County, Tennessee
Cities in Washington County, Tennessee
Populated places established in 1856
1856 establishments in Tennessee
East Tennessee
Johnson City metropolitan area, Tennessee 
State of Franklin